Cefn-y-bedd railway station serves the village of Cefn-y-bedd in Flintshire, Wales. It was opened in 1866 by the Wrexham, Mold and Connah's Quay Railway, which later became part of the Great Central Railway system.

History
The station used to have a 14-lever signal box to the north of the Bidston-bound platform, and a goods yard adjacent to the western side of the station. The signal box was in use until 1945 and the goods yard closed on 14 May 1964. The station became unstaffed in 1969, but the main building on the northbound side has survived and is now privately owned. The brick shelter on the southbound side is one of only two still standing of that particular design (the other being at nearby ).

Facilities
The station is an unstaffed halt with basic amenities only (CIS screens, waiting shelters and timetable poster boards on each platform). Step-free access is available to both sides, though the platform ramps are steep and the only means of access to platform 2 is via a barrow crossing (which should be used with care).

Services
The station sees an hourly service on weekdays (two-hourly in the evening and on bank holidays) southbound to Wrexham Central and northbound to Bidston for connections to Birkenhead and Liverpool via the Wirral Lines.

On Sundays there is a train every 90 minutes each way.

Gallery

References

Sources

External links

Railway stations in Flintshire
DfT Category F2 stations
Former Great Central Railway stations
Railway stations in Great Britain opened in 1866
Railway stations served by Transport for Wales Rail
1866 establishments in Wales